Offshore is the fifth full-length album by Early Day Miners, released in 2006 on Secretly Canadian Records. Offshore is a continuous six-song exploration of the musical  and lyrical themes presented in the band's song "Offshore", from their 2002 album Let Us Garlands Bring.

Track listing
 "Land of Pale Saints" – 9:11
 "Deserter" – 4:07
 "Sans Revival" – 4:29
 "Return of the Native" – 3:39
 "Silent Tents" – 7:05
 "Hymn Beneath the Palisades" – 9:03

Personnel
 Dan Burton: vocals, guitar
 Joseph Brumley: guitar
 Darin Gray: prepared bass
 Matt Griffin: drums
 Dan Matz: guitar
 Jonathan Richardson: bass
 Jonathan Ford: bass
 Amber Webber: vocals on "Return of the Native"

References

Early Day Miners albums
2006 albums
Secretly Canadian albums